Pål Bye (born 21 May 1946) is a retired Norwegian handball goalkeeper who competed in the 1972 Summer Olympics.

He was born in Oslo and represented the club Oppsal IF. In 1972 he was part of the Norwegian team which finished ninth in the Olympic tournament. He played four matches. In total he was capped 150 times between 1965 and 1980.

References

1946 births
Living people
Norwegian male handball players
Olympic handball players of Norway
Handball players at the 1972 Summer Olympics
Handball players from Oslo